Zamboanga Sibugay's at-large congressional district was the lone congressional district of the Philippines in the province of Zamboanga Sibugay for the House of Representatives from 2001 to 2007. It was created after the passage of Republic Act No. 8973 in 2000 which partitioned the province of Zamboanga del Sur and established the province of Zamboanga Sibugay. The district was represented by Belma A. Cabilao for the entirety of its existence. She was redistricted to Zamboanga Sibugay's 1st congressional district after the passage of Republic Act No. 9232 which abolished the district and reapportioned Zamboanga Sibugay into two congressional districts following the 2007 census.

Representation history

See also
Legislative districts of Zamboanga Sibugay

References

Former congressional districts of the Philippines
Politics of Zamboanga Sibugay
2000 establishments in the Philippines
2007 disestablishments in the Philippines
At-large congressional districts of the Philippines
Congressional districts of Zamboanga Peninsula
Constituencies established in 2000
Constituencies disestablished in 2007